The Equality Act 2006 (c 3) is an Act of the Parliament of the United Kingdom covering the United Kingdom. The 2006 Act is a precursor to the Equality Act 2010, which combines all of the equality enactments within Great Britain and provide comparable protections across all equality strands. Those explicitly mentioned by the Equality Act 2006 include age; disability; sex; proposed, commenced or completed gender reassignment; race; religion or belief and sexual orientation.
The changes it made were:

creating the Equality and Human Rights Commission (EHRC) (merging the Commission for Racial Equality, the Equal Opportunities Commission and the Disability Rights Commission)
outlawing of discrimination on goods and services on the grounds of religion and belief (subject to certain exemptions)
allowing the Government to introduce regulations outlawing discrimination on the ground of sexual orientation in goods and services, which led to the Sexual Orientation Regulations 2006
creating a public duty to promote equality on the ground of gender (The Equality Act 2006, section 84, inserting section 76A of the Sex Discrimination Act 1975, now found in section 1 of the Equality Act 2010)

Overview
With the exception of the provision relating to goods and services discrimination in Northern Ireland on the grounds of sexual orientation, the Act relates to equality law in Great Britain, as a separate legislative framework exists for Northern Ireland which also has a separate equality body, the Equality Commission for Northern Ireland (though by and large reflecting the general approach to equality legislation in Great Britain).

Background
In 1998, the Runnymede Trust published a report by Bhikhu Parekh calling for a new Equality Act which would consolidate and advance existing legislation.

The Equality Bill first appeared in the 2004/05 Session, but did not make it into law before Parliament was dissolved ahead of the 2005 general election. In its manifesto, the Labour Party promised to reintroduce the Bill, which it duly accomplished upon its reinstatement in Westminster.

At this stage, only "religion or belief" was included in the anti-discrimination clauses. The Labour Party specifically did not wish to ban discrimination on the grounds of sexual orientation.

After the bill was reintroduced, further lobbying by openly gay Peer the Lord Alli succeeded in forcing the government to add homophobic discrimination to the Bill.

However, the lateness of this concession meant the extra provisions could not be included substantively in the primary legislation. Instead, legislators agreed to delegate the drafting of regulations to the Government. After a public consultation and a protracted debate within the Cabinet, these were eventually laid before Parliament as the Equality Act (Sexual Orientation) Regulations 2007.

Further promised legislation also includes a provision to provide for protection for people in the provision of goods and services on the grounds of gender reassignment in order to comply with an EU Directive.

Cases under the Act
In mid-2010, following the June 2010 United Kingdom Budget, which allocated a series of cuts across government departments and the public sector, the Fawcett Society filed an action for judicial review, on the ground that the budget paid no regard to the disparate negative impact on women as it should have under section 84 of the Equality Act 2006 and section 76A of the Sex Discrimination Act 1975. This requires every public authority, not excluding the Treasury or the Cabinet Office, to "have due regard to the need— (a) to eliminate unlawful discrimination and harassment, and (b) to promote equality of opportunity between men and women". It was alleged that the government failed to "have due regard" to the disparate impact of its budget on women.

Section 93 – Commencement
The following orders have been made under this section:
The Equality Act 2006 (Commencement No. 1) Order 2006 (S.I. 2006/1082 (C.36))
The Equality Act 2006 (Commencement No. 2) Order 2007 (S.I. 2007/1092 (C.48)) 
The Equality Act 2006 (Commencement No. 3 and Savings) Order 2007 (S.I. 2007/2603 (C.100))

Notes

References
C. O'Cinneide, "The Commission for Equality and Human Rights: A New Institution for New and Uncertain Times" (2007) 36(2) Industrial Law Journal 141

External links

Explanatory notes to the Equality Act 2006.

United Kingdom Acts of Parliament 2006
Anti-discrimination law in the United Kingdom
Race relations in the United Kingdom
Disability law in the United Kingdom
LGBT law in the United Kingdom
Transgender law in the United Kingdom
February 2006 events in the United Kingdom
2006 in LGBT history